Bethel Mission may refer to:

 Bethel Mission, German East Africa
 Bethel Mission, Shanghai
 Bethel Mission School, India

See also
 Bethel Institution